Francisco Rodríguez (born 18 March 1976) is a Paraguayan former professional tennis player.

Tennis career
Rodríguez played collegiate tennis for the University of Alabama before turning professional, earning All-American honours for singles in both 1998 and 1999. On the professional tour he won his first ITF Futures singles title in 2003 at Montego Bay and during his career won a further five Futures titles in doubles. He had a career high singles world ranking of 373, attained in 2004.

A member of the Paraguay Davis Cup team from 1998 to 2007, Rodríguez featured in a total of 13 ties and won 19 rubbers, 14 of which came in singles. In 2004 he had an upset win over Brazil's top player Marcos Daniel, 11–9 in the fifth set, which helped Paraguay qualify for the Davis Cup World Group playoffs.

Personal life
Soon after retiring, Rodríguez came out as gay in a feature in Out.

References

External links
 
 
 

1976 births
Living people
Paraguayan male tennis players
Alabama Crimson Tide men's tennis players
Gay sportsmen
LGBT tennis players